Blanche is an unincorporated community and census-designated place (CDP) in Lincoln County, Tennessee, United States. It was first listed as a CDP prior to the 2020 census.

It is in the southwest part of the county and is bordered to the southeast by Taft. Tennessee State Route 110 passes through Blanche, leading southwest  to Ardmore and northeast  to Fayetteville, the Lincoln county seat.

The east side of Blanche drains to Pinnel Creek, and the west side drains Kelly Creek; both creeks flow north to the Elk River, a southwest-flowing tributary of the Tennessee River. The south part of the CDP drains to Limestone Creek, which flows south to the Tennessee River in Alabama.

Demographics

References 

Populated places in Lincoln County, Tennessee
Census-designated places in Lincoln County, Tennessee
Census-designated places in Tennessee